Ekali is an affluent suburb of Athens, Greece. Located to the north of the city centre, it is a green and lush area home to many of the country's most powerful business and shipping families. Since the 2011 local government reform it is part of the municipality of Kifisia, as a municipal unit.

Etymology 
Ekali was an ancient municipality of Athens and belonged to the Leontida tribe. Its inhabitants were named Ekalios. According to tradition, the name is associated with the name of a woman named Ekali. As Plutarch says, as Theseus went to Marathon to catch the famous bull that had caused great damage to the area, the weather conditions were unfavorable. The Athenian king sought refuge in the hut of an old woman, called Ekali. The old woman promised Theseus that she would make a sacrifice to Zeus for the success of his mission. When Theseus caught the bull, he returned to the hut, but found the old woman dead. Grateful for her sacrifice, he later created the sanctuary of Ekaliou Dios and named the region Ekali, where he created the homonymous municipality.

Geography

Ekali is situated at the western end of the forested Penteli mountain range. The municipal unit has an area of 4.332 km2. The small river Kifisos forms the western border of the municipal unit.

The main thoroughfare is Thiseos Avenue (Greek National Road 83), which connects Ekali with Kifisia and central Athens. Motorway 1 (Athens - Thessaloniki) passes west of Ekali near Thrakomakedones. Ekali is a purely residential area, which means that retail, commercial shops and professional businesses are not permitted within the community.

Notable people
Giannis Spyropoulos (one of the most popular Abstract Greek painters) lived in Ekali. In 1990 after the painter's death the Spyropoulos Foundation was established there.
Former Socialist Prime Minister Andreas Papandreou lived in Ekali in his final years and the Greek media often used "Ekali" in the same way the British media use "Downing Street" or the American media use "the White House".
Shipping, oil and banking heir and billionaire Spiros Latsis.
Vardis Vardinogiannis, prominent billionaire businessman.
Andreas Vgenopoulos (businessman), financier, largest shareholder of Marfin Investment Group.
Anna Vissi, famous Greek singer and artist.
Adonis Georgiadis, Greek politician, Minister for Development and Investment (Cabinet of Kyriakos Mitsotakis 2019-)
Latsis family, billionaire business family
Dimitris Giannakopoulos, owner of Vianex S.A. and Panathinaikos B.C.
Menios Fourthiotis, Greek tv presenter
Panagiotis Bitros, millionaire businessman and owner of Bitros Steel
 Kostas Crommydas, well known actor
Fostiropoulos family, well known shipowner 
Michalis Chrysafidis, businessman who was murdered along with his family in Ekali
George Tragkas, famous journalist
Liana Kanelli, member of the Communist Party of Greece and journalist
Tzirakian family, owner of Europa Profil S.A.
Nikos Hadjinikolaou, famous editor and journalist 
Giannis Poulopoulos, famous singer 
Stefanos Manos, politician

Sites of interest
Giannis Spyropoulos Museum
Agia Marina Church

See also
List of municipalities of Attica

References

External links
Official Website of Ekali 

Populated places in North Athens (regional unit)

it:Ekali